L-peptidase is an enzyme. This enzyme catalyses the following chemical reaction

 Autocatalytically cleaves itself from the polyprotein of the foot-and-mouth disease virus by hydrolysis of a Lys-Gly bond. Subsequently, it cleaves host cell initiation factor eIF-4G at bonds -Gly-Arg- and -Lys-Arg-

This enzyme is coded bz foot-and-mouth disease virus.

References

External links 
 

EC 3.4.22